The 1898–99 season was the fifth in the history of the Southern League. This season saw the expansion of Division One up to 14 teams and creation of Division Two South-West, though it was disbanded at the end of the season after all its clubs left. No Southern League clubs applied for promotion to the Football League.
Southampton were Division One champions for the third season in a row. Overall Division Two champions being decided in a playoff in which Thames Ironworks defeated Cowes 3-1 at The Den.

Division One

A total of 14 teams contest the division, including ten sides from previous season and four new teams.

Teams promoted from 1897-98 Division Two:
 Royal Artillery Portsmouth - test matches winners
 Warmley - test matches winners
Newly elected teams:
 Bedminster (elected from the Western League)
 Brighton United

Division Two London

Division Two London was formed on basis of previous season Division Two. A total of 12 teams contest the division, including eight sides from previous season and four new teams.

Team relegated from Division One:
 Wolverton L&NWR - test matches losers
Newly elected teams:
 Thames Ironworks - London League winners
 Brentford
 Fulham

Division Two South-West

Division Two South-West was newly formed and short-lived formation. At the end of the season the division was liquidated and the League returned to 2-division structure.

Promotion-relegation test matches
At the end of the season, test matches were held between the bottom two clubs in Division One and the top club in both Division Twos. Royal Artillery Portsmouth lost 4-1 to Cowes and were relegated to Division Two, whilst Cowes were promoted. Royal Artillery Portsmouth then disbanded. Sheppey United and Thames Ironworks drew 1-1, leading to Sheppey remaining in Division One and Thames Ironworks joining them.

References

External links 
Southern League First Division Tables at RSSSF
Southern League Second Division Tables at RSSSF

1898-99
1898–99 in English association football leagues